C1 chemistry is the chemistry of one-carbon molecules.  Although many compounds and ions contain only one carbon, stable and abundant C-1 feedstocks are the focus of research.  Four compounds are of major industrial importance: methane, carbon monoxide, carbon dioxide, and methanol.  Technologies that interconvert these species are often used massively to match supply to demand.

Industrial processes
Carbon monoxide and methanol are important chemical feedstocks.  CO is utilized by myriad carbonylation reactions.  Together with hydrogen, it is the feed for the Fischer–Tropsch process, which affords liquid fuels.  Methanol is the precursor to acetic acid, dimethyl ether, formaldehyde, and many methyl compounds (esters, amines, halides). A larger scale application is methanol to olefins, which produces ethylene and propylene.
 
In contrast to the situation for carbon monoxide and methanol, methane and carbon dioxide have limited uses as feedstocks to chemicals and fuels.  This disparity contrasts with the relative abundance of methane and carbon dioxide.  Methane is often partially converted to carbon monoxide for utilization in Fischer-Tropsch processes. Of interest for upgrading methane is its oxidative coupling:
 2 +  →  + 2

Conversion of carbon dioxide to unsaturated hydrocarbons via electrochemical reduction is a hopeful avenue of research, but no stable and economic technology yet has been developed.

Biochemistry

Methane, carbon monoxide, carbon dioxide, and methanol also are substrates and products of enzymatic processes.  In methanogenesis, carbon monoxide, carbon dioxide, and methanol are converted to methane, provided suitable reducing agents. Methanogenesis by methanogenic archaea is reversible.

In photosynthesis, carbon dioxide and water is converted to sugars (and O2), the energy for this (thermally) uphill reaction being provided by sunlight.

References

Chemistry